Aperture Peak is a 13,265-foot-elevation (4,043 meter) mountain summit located in Inyo County, California, United States.

Description
Aperture Peak is set within the John Muir Wilderness, on land managed by Inyo National Forest. It is situated one-half mile east of the crest of the Sierra Nevada mountain range in the Palisades area, just outside the boundary of Kings Canyon National Park. Aperture Peak ranks as the 95th-highest summit in California, and the fourth-highest peak of the Inconsolable Range. The west face of the peak features a large, white, diagonal dike, and a rock glacier lies below the east face.

History
The first ascent of the summit was made June 14, 1934, by David Brower and Hervey Voge. This landform's toponym was officially adopted in 1969 by the U.S. Board on Geographic Names, but the name was used informally by mountaineers for years prior. The geological term "aperture" is the measure of the distance separating adjacent rock walls relating to joints and open discontinuities.

Climate
According to the Köppen climate classification system, Aperture Peak is located in an alpine climate zone. Most weather fronts originate in the Pacific Ocean, and travel east toward the Sierra Nevada mountains. As fronts approach, they are forced upward by the peaks (orographic lift), causing them to drop their moisture in the form of rain or snowfall onto the range. Precipitation runoff from this mountain drains east into headwaters of North Fork Big Pine Creek, and west into headwaters of South Fork Bishop Creek.

Gallery

See also
 
 List of the major 4000-meter summits of California
 Thirteener

References

External links
 Weather forecast: Aperture Peak

Inyo National Forest
Mountains of Inyo County, California
Mountains of the John Muir Wilderness
North American 4000 m summits
Mountains of Northern California
Sierra Nevada (United States)